Willie Gamage is the Governor of the Southern Province of Sri Lanka.

References

Governors of Southern Province, Sri Lanka
Living people
Year of birth missing (living people)
Place of birth missing (living people)
21st-century Sri Lankan politicians